Corey Alexander Sears (born April 15, 1973) is a former professional American football player who played defensive end for six seasons for the St. Louis Rams, the Arizona Cardinals, and the Houston Texans.

1973 births
Living people
Judson High School alumni
Players of American football from San Antonio
American football defensive ends
Navarro Bulldogs football players
Mississippi State Bulldogs football players
St. Louis Rams players
Arizona Cardinals players
Houston Texans players